Tap 011 was a Serbian pop group active from 1994 – 2002, with a brief reunion in 2011. Tap 011's predecessor was the rap group Tapiri, consisting of Milan Bojanić, Đorđe "Đole" Pajović, Petar "Pera" Stupar and others. In 1994  Ivana Pavlović and Goca Tržan joined as vocalists and the band decided to switch to another music genre. They also started working with manager Gane Pecikoza who has remained their manager ever since. The group then shortened their name from 'Tapiri' to 'Tap', '011' referencing the country code for Belgrade, where they were all from.

History
The Serbian pop band was formed in 1992 under the name Tapiri.

In 1994 they changed the name to Tap 011. Tap's first album, Novi Svet (New World), released in early 1995. This was followed by numerous concerts, awards, and frequent radio air-time. With the release of their second album, Gace (Underpants), Tap 011 won many music awards and performed domestically and internationally in Germany, Switzerland, Austria, and France. 

In 1999, Goca Tržan left the group, followed shortly by Ivana Pavlović's departure. Goca began a solo career, and Ivana formed her own band Negative. In the summer of 2000, almost a year and a half after the bombing of Yugoslavia, Milan, Pera and Djole re-assembled the band. The new singers were Štajdohar Ana and Natasa Guberinić. In 2001, they issued their fourth album Čudesna Ploča (Marvelous Disc), the first with the new lineup. In 2002, after releasing their last album, 5 Element, they broke up.

On April 1, 2011, they held a farewell concert at Štark Arena under the name Taprililili.

Discography

Studio albums
 1993 - Milenijum Posle Misterija I (Millennium After Mysteries I) (as Tapiri)
 1995 - Novi Svet (New World)
 1996 - Gaće (Underpants)
 1998 - Igra (The Game)
 2001 - Čudesna Ploča (Marvelous Disc)
 2002 - 5 Element (5th Element)

Extended plays
 1997 - Lesi

Singles
 1993 - Funky Life
 1993 - Tapir's Nightmare
 1995 - Novi svet
 1995 - Bunda
 1995 - Hit
 1995 - Gaće
 1995 - Zbog tebe
1996 - Sanjaj Me
 1997 - Lesi
 1998 - Dosadan dan
 1998 - Okreni broj 95
 1998 - Igra
 2000 - 011
 2000 - Plava
 2000 - Reka
 2000 - Kapetan lađe
 2002 - Playboy

References

Musical groups established in 1992
Musical groups from Belgrade
Serbian pop music groups